Avantor, Inc. is a chemicals and materials company headquartered in Radnor, Pennsylvania. The company ranked 484th on the 2020 Fortune 500, based on its 2019 sales.

History
In 1904, John Townsend Baker founded the chemical company J.T. Baker. The company was acquired by Procter & Gamble in 1985, and was subsequently sold to Mallinckrodt in 1995. 

In 2010, investment firm New Mountain Capital purchased Mallinckrodt Baker Inc., which then changed its name to Avantor. The company expanded globally with the 2011 acquisitions of Indian laboratory reagents supplier RFCL and Polish lab supply firm POCH.

In 2016, Avantor merged with Nusil Technology. In 2017, Avantor acquired chemical blending business Puritan Products Inc. and laboratory supplies company VWR. The combined company operates under the Avantor name, with VWR and vwr.com remaining as a selling channel. 

In May 2019, Avantor went public with a $3.8 billion initial public offering, which gave the company a market capitalization of $7.62 billion. This was the second biggest initial public offering of the year. That same year the company expanded further into Asia with the opening of an innovation center in Shanghai, which focuses on monoclonal antibodies and cell and gene therapy. In 2020, Avantor doubled the size of its Bridgewater, New Jersey innovation center, expanding its research and development capabilities and cell and gene therapy reagent manufacturing.

In June 2021, Avantor acquired China-based RIM Bio, a manufacturer of single-use bioprocess bags and assemblies for biopharmaceutical manufacturing applications. 
Through the acquisition, Avantor gained access to RIM’s Changzhou, China facility, marking Avantor’s first single-use production plant in the Africa, Middle East, Asia (AMEA) region. The deal is part of a larger expansion of the company’s single-use manufacturing footprint with plans to increase its presence by 30%.

On April 6 2021, Avantor was named "Best Bioprocessing Supplier in Single-Use Manufacturing" at the Asia-Pacific Bioprocessing Excellence Awards and "Best Company in Bioprocessing Excellence for Single-use Solutions" and "Best Bioprocessing Supplier for Upstream Processing" at Biologics Manufacturing Korea.

COVID-19
During the COVID19 pandemic, Avantor continuously supplied medical-grade and FDA-compliant silicone technology that meets device manufacturers' unique production needs.

In 2020, Avantor began providing services and raw materials to companies manufacturing vaccines and other therapies to fight the COVID-19 pandemic. Avantor added employees and extra shifts in order to increase capacity for producing synthetic lipids that are formed into nanoparticles, which carry mRNA into human cells.

Industries
Avantor provides products and services to the biopharma, healthcare, education and government, advanced technologies, and applied materials industries. The company has more than 6 million different products.

Avantor serves the biopharma industry by enhancing capabilities in the development and manufacture of safe and effective biological medicines such as monoclonal antibodies and cell and gene therapy. The company provides access to products, services, solutions and expertise for all stages of treatment development.

Avantor’s NuSil brand provides silicone solutions for long-term implantable devices, including high-purity silicone adhesives and lubricious silicones. A dispensing system developed by NuSil injects pre-sterilized silicone directly into the body, allowing the material to conform to the patient's anatomy and cure into its final form, creating a custom-fit device.

Controversies 
On August 26, 2020, Bloomberg News implicated Avantor and other companies in the U.S. opioid epidemic. According to Bloomberg, one of their compounds "acetic anhydride", was used illicitly by drug traffickers to convert crude opium into heroin. Bloomberg also found evidence that Avantor’s compound was used in cartel drug labs, and that regulations implemented in 2018 didn't stop it from being widely available. In response, Avantor discontinued all sales of acetic anhydride in Mexico and destroyed its existing inventory. In 2021, Texas Senator John Cornyn, who serves on both the Judiciary Committee and the bipartisan Caucus on International Narcotics Control claims that Avantor should have known better, selling acetic anhydride within Mexico's unregulated market. What should have raised eyebrows as well is that it was sold in 18-liter containers, which is inconsistent with the ordinary use of acetic anhydride. Four other Republican senators also deplored Avantor's “apparent longstanding contribution to the opioid epidemic that killed 50,000 of our fellow citizens in 2019.”

References

External links
 

Chemical companies of the United States
2019 initial public offerings
Companies listed on the New York Stock Exchange
Private equity portfolio companies